Raziabad (also Romanized as Raẕīābād; also known as Raẕīābād Ḩarīrī) is a village in Ahmadabad-e Mostowfi Rural District, in the Central District of Eslamshahr County, Tehran Province, Iran. At the 2006 census, its population was 561, in 134 families.

References 

Populated places in Eslamshahr County